Michel Voisin (born 6 October 1944, Replonges, Ain) is a former member of the National Assembly of France.  He represented the 4th constituency of the Ain department,  and is a member of The Republicans.

References

1944 births
Living people
People from Ain
Centre of Social Democrats politicians
Union for French Democracy politicians
Union for a Popular Movement politicians
The Popular Right
Mayors of places in Auvergne-Rhône-Alpes
Deputies of the 11th National Assembly of the French Fifth Republic
Deputies of the 12th National Assembly of the French Fifth Republic
Deputies of the 13th National Assembly of the French Fifth Republic
Deputies of the 14th National Assembly of the French Fifth Republic
Deputies for Ain (French Fifth Republic)